The Campeonato Carioca Estadual de Basquete (English: Carioca State Basketball Championship), or Rio de Janeiro State Basketball Championship, is an annual men's professional club basketball competition. The tournament is contested between clubs from Rio de Janeiro State, Brazil.

History
The Campeonato Carioca (Carioca Championship) basketball competition began in 1924. The Carioca Championship was not contested in the year 2017.

Carioca (Rio de Janeiro) State champions

Titles by club

See also
New Basket Brazil (NBB)
Brazilian Championship
São Paulo State Championship

References

External links
Carioca Basketball Federation official website 
Carioca Basketball State Championship 2017 
Carioca Basketball State Championship at Latinbasket.com
New Basket Brazil official website 
Basketball Brazil official website  

1924 establishments in Brazil
Campeonato Carioca de Estado de Basquete
Rio de Janeiro
Sports leagues established in 1924